Atromitos Piraeus Football Club is a Greek football club based in Kaminia, Piraeus, Greece.

The club was founded in 1926. They are currently competing in the Local Championship of Piraeus after having been relegated from the third tier of the Greek football league system, Gamma Ethniki.

History

Atromitos Piraeus F.C. founded from Kaminian people such as Moiras, Skordilis and the photographer Keleris. Before World War II and during the German occupation the existence of the team played an important role for the development and advancement of amateur football.

Originally home ground of the team was Karaiskakis Stadium and afterwards Proodeutiki Stadium, Renti Municipal Stadium and Kaminia Municipal Stadium.

Atromitos finished second behind Olympiacos in the 1947 Piraeus championship , thus earning the right to compete in the national championship. In the national championship, Atromitos finished fourth among six teams. This is Atromitos best finish ever. 

Team started from Piraeus regional football leagues and went as far as A Ethniki at 1960-61 season as previous year champion of B Ethniki.

From 1962 season to 1979 played in B Ethniki taking away several times good places in the final standings.

Honours

Domestic
 Greek FCA Winners' Championship: 1
 1959–60
 Delta Ethniki: 1
 1980–81
 Pireaus Champions: 8
 1959–60, 1993–94, 1995–96, 1998–99, 1999–00, 2004–05, 2009–10, 2017–18
 Pireaus Cup Winners: 4
 1987–88, 1999–00, 2004–05, 2011–12

 
Football clubs in Piraeus
Association football clubs established in 1926
1926 establishments in Greece